Lithuania participated in the Eurovision Song Contest 2019 with the song "Run with the Lions" written by Ashley Hicklin, Eric Lumiere and Pele Loriano. The song was performed by Jurij Veklenko. The Lithuanian broadcaster Lithuanian National Radio and Television (LRT) organised the national final  (Eurovision Song Contest national selection) in order to select the Lithuanian entry for the 2019 contest in Tel Aviv, Israel. The national final took place over seven weeks and involved 49 competing entries. The results of each show were determined by the combination of votes from a jury panel and a public vote. In the final, eight artists and songs remained and "Run with the Lions" performed by Jurijus was selected as the winner.

Lithuania was drawn to compete in the second semi-final of the Eurovision Song Contest which took place on 16 May 2019. Performing during the show in position 12, "Run with the Lions" was not announced among the top 10 entries of the second semi-final and therefore did not qualify to compete in the final. It was later revealed that Lithuania placed eleventh out of the 18 participating countries in the semi-final with 93 points.

Background

Prior to the 2019 contest, Lithuania had participated in the Eurovision Song Contest nineteen times since its first entry in 1994. The nation's best placing in the contest was sixth, which it achieved in 2006 with the song "We Are the Winners" performed by LT United. In the 2018 contest, "When We're Old" performed by Ieva Zasimauskaitė qualified to the final where the song scored 181 points and placed 12th.

For the 2019 contest, the Lithuanian national broadcaster, Lithuanian National Radio and Television (LRT), broadcast the event within Lithuania and organised the selection process for the nation's entry. Other than the internal selection of their debut entry in 1994, Lithuania has selected their entry consistently through a national final procedure. LRT confirmed their intentions to participate at the 2019 Eurovision Song Contest on 8 August 2018. On 10 October 2018, LRT announced the organization of "Eurovizijos" dainų konkurso nacionalinė atranka, which would be the national final to select Lithuania's entry for Tel Aviv.

Before Eurovision

"Eurovizijos" dainų konkurso nacionalinė atranka
 (Eurovision Song Contest national selection) was the national final format developed by LRT in order to select Lithuania's entry for the Eurovision Song Contest 2019. The competition involved a seven-week-long process that commenced on 5 January 2019 and concluded with a winning song and artist on 23 February 2019. The seven shows were hosted by Gabrielė Martirosianaitė and Giedrius Masalskis and were broadcast on LRT televizija, LRT Lituanica and LRT Radijas as well as online via the broadcaster's website lrt.lt.

Format 
The 2019 competition involved 49 entries and consisted of seven shows. The first to fourth shows were the heats consisting of 11 to 13 entries each. The top six entries proceeded in the competition from each heat, while the remaining 24 entries participated in the fifth and sixth shows which were the competition's semi-finals where 12 entries participated in each show and the top four proceeded to the final. In the final, the winner was selected from the remaining eight entries. A monetary prize of €5,000 was also awarded to the winning songwriters by the Lithuanian Copyright Protection Association (LATGA) in order to encourage further development of the song in an aim to achieve international success.

The results of each of the seven shows were determined by the 50/50 combination of votes from a jury panel and public televoting. The ranking developed by both streams of voting was converted to points from 1-8, 10 and 12 and assigned based on the number of competing songs in the respective show. During the first six shows, the jury panel consisted of three to four members, while the jury panel in the final consisted of seven members. The public could vote through telephone and SMS voting. Ties in all shows were decided in favour of the entry that received the most points from the jury.

Competing entries
On 10 October 2018, LRT opened two separate submission forms: one for artists and another for songwriters to submit their songs. Artists that applied to compete with a song were required to indicate which song they wanted to compete with on their application. The submission deadline for both applications concluded on 10 December 2018. On 14 December 2018, LRT announced the 49 artists selected for the competition. Among the artists were previous Lithuanian Eurovision contestant Erica Jennings, who represented Lithuania in 2001 as part of SKAMP, Sasha Song, who represented the nation in 2009, and Jurgis Did, who represented the nation in 2010 as part of InCulto. The final changes to the list of 49 competing acts were later made with the addition of the group 120 to the list of performers, the addition of the song "Light On" for Monika Marija and the withdrawal of singers Algirdas Daumantas Ciūnys, Emilija Valiukevičiūtė, Linas Jakštys, and Sasha Song and Dovilė.

Shows

Heats 
The four heats of the competition aired on 5 January, 19 January, 26 January and 2 February 2019 and featured the 49 competing entries. The members of the jury consisted of Ramūnas Zilnys (music reviewer; all heats), Vytautas Bikus (composer; first heat), Jonas Nainys (producer and DJ; first heat), Giedrė Kilčiauskienė (singer; second heat), Rasa Bubulytė (singer; second heat), Leon Somov (producer and composer; third heat), Vytautas Rumšas (actor; third heat), Vilius Alesius (musician and singer; fourth heat) and Jurga Šeduikytė (singer-songwriter; fourth heat). The top six entries advanced to the semi-finals from each heat, while the bottom entries were eliminated. Before the broadcast of the fourth heat, Gabrielė Rybko was disqualified due to breaking the twenty-eighth selection rule of the competition in regards to the fairness of the televote. However, her recorded performance was still part of the show.

Semi-finals
The two semi-finals of the competition took place on 9 and 16 February 2019 and featured twelve competing entries each. The semi-finals were broadcast live; all other preceding shows were pre-recorded earlier in the week before their airdates. The members of the jury consisted of Ramūnas Zilnys (music reviewer; first and second semi-final), Arnoldas Lukošius (keyboardist; first semi-final), Julija Ritčik (singer; first semi-final), Sigutė Stonytė (singer; second semi-final), Deivydas Zvonkus (lead singer of the group B'Avarija; second semi-final) and Ieva Narkutė (singer; second semi-final). The top four entries advanced to the final from each semi-final, while the bottom eight were eliminated.

On 21 February 2019, Monika Marija withdrew one of her two songs "Criminal", which placed third in the second semi-final, after clarifying that she only wanted to compete with her other song "Light On" in the final. The song "Your Cure" performed by Alen Chicco, which placed fifth in the second semi-final, replaced the withdrawn song and advanced to the final.

Final 
The final of the competition took place on 23 February 2019 and featured the remaining eight entries that qualified from the semi-finals. The members of the jury consisted of Ramūnas Zilnys (music reviewer), Vytautas Bikus (composer), Jonas Nainys (producer and DJ), Leon Somov (producer and composer), Simona Albavičiūtė-Bandita (radio host), Darius Užkuraitis (LRT Opus director) and Mykolas Katkus (lead singer of the group Tha Station). "Run with the Lions" performed by Jurijus was selected as the winner after gaining the most points from both the jury vote and the public vote. In addition to the performances of the competing entries, interval acts included Moniqué and Mantas performing the song "Ateities žmogus", Ieva Zasimauskaitė performing the 2018 Lithuanian Eurovision entry "When We're Old" and Carousel performing the 2019 Latvian Eurovision entry "That Night".

Preparation 
Jurij Veklenko traveled to Switzerland to work on a revamped version of "Run with the Lions" with composers Eric Lumiere and Pele Loriano following his win during the Lithuanian national final. The revamped version was released on 3 April 2019.

Promotion 
Jurij Veklenko made several appearances across Europe to specifically promote "Run with the Lions" as the Lithuanian Eurovision entry. On 6 April, Veklenko performed during the Eurovision in Concert event which was held at the AFAS Live venue in Amsterdam, Netherlands and hosted by Edsilia Rombley and Marlayne. On 14 April, Veklenko performed during the London Eurovision Party, which was held at the Café de Paris venue in London, United Kingdom hosted by Nicki French and Paddy O'Connell. On 21 April, Veklenko performed during the Eurovision Pre-Party Madrid event, which was held at the Sala La Riviera venue in Madrid, Spain and hosted by Tony Aguilar and Julia Varela.

At Eurovision
According to Eurovision rules, all nations with the exceptions of the host country and the "Big Five" (France, Germany, Italy, Spain and the United Kingdom) are required to qualify from one of two semi-finals in order to compete for the final; the top ten countries from each semi-final progress to the final. The European Broadcasting Union (EBU) split up the competing countries into six different pots based on voting patterns from previous contests, with countries with favourable voting histories put into the same pot. On 28 January 2019, an allocation draw was held which placed each country into one of the two semi-finals, as well as which half of the show they would perform in. Lithuania was placed into the second semi-final, to be held on 16 May 2019, and was scheduled to perform in the second half of the show.

Once all the competing songs for the 2019 contest had been released, the running order for the semi-finals was decided by the shows' producers rather than through another draw, so that similar songs were not placed next to each other. Lithuania was set to perform in position 12, following the entry from Malta and before the entry from Russia.

The two semi-finals and final were broadcast in Lithuania on LRT and LRT Radijas with commentary by Darius Užkuraitis and Gerūta Griniūtė. The Lithuanian spokesperson, who announced the top 12-point score awarded by the Lithuanian jury during the final, was Giedrius Masalskis.

Semi-final

Jurij Veklenko took part in technical rehearsals on 7 and 11 May, followed by dress rehearsals on 15 and 16 May. This included the jury show on 15 May where the professional juries of each country watched and voted on the competing entries.

The Lithuanian performance featured Jurij Veklenko in a black outfit and performing on stage alone with the LED screens displaying gold and red spots as well as imagery of people running. The stage director for the Lithuanian performance was Povilas Varvuolis. Jurij Veklenko was also joined by five off-stage backing vocalists: Algė Matekūnaitė, Berta Timinskaitė, Eglė Gadeikytė, Justina Budaitė and Silvija Pankėnaitė.

At the end of the show, Lithuania was not announced among the top 10 entries in the second semi-final and therefore failed to qualify to compete in the final. It was later revealed that Lithuania placed eleventh in the semi-final, receiving a total of 93 points: 77 points from the televoting and 16 points from the juries.

Voting
Voting during the three shows involved each country awarding two sets of points from 1–8, 10 and 12: one from their professional jury and the other from televoting. Each nation's jury consisted of five music industry professionals who are citizens of the country they represent, with their names published before the contest to ensure transparency. This jury judged each entry based on: vocal capacity; the stage performance; the song's composition and originality; and the overall impression by the act. In addition, no member of a national jury was permitted to be related in any way to any of the competing acts in such a way that they cannot vote impartially and independently. The individual rankings of each jury member as well as the nation's televoting results will be released shortly after the grand final.

Below is a breakdown of points awarded to Lithuania and awarded by Lithuania in the second semi-final and grand final of the contest, and the breakdown of the jury voting and televoting conducted during the two shows:

Points awarded to Lithuania

Points awarded by Lithuania

Detailed voting results
The following members comprised the Lithuanian jury:
  (jury chairperson)composer
 Andrius Mamontovassinger, composer, lyricist, represented Lithuania in the 2006 contest as part of LT United
 singer
 singer, songwriter
 Gerūta GriniūtėTV & radio host

References

External links

2019
Countries in the Eurovision Song Contest 2019
Eurovision